The 2012–13 National League B season was played from September 14, 2012 to February 10, 2013. The regular season was won by HC Ajoie with 105 points.

Participating Teams

Regular Season Standings

Playoffs

League Qualification

Lausanne HC will play the losing team of a Play-Out tournament from the National League A for the 12th and final spot in the top division next year.

External links
  National League B, official website
  National League B, official website

National League B seasons
2
Swiss